Stomp 442 is the seventh studio album by American heavy metal band Anthrax. It was released in 1995 by Elektra Records. The band and the Philadelphia-based producers Butcher Brothers produced the album, which includes the singles, "Fueled" and "Nothing". The album debuted at No. 47 on the Billboard 200 charts. The album is their last to be released by Elektra Records, as they left the label after claiming that they didn't do enough to promote the album. Stomp 442 is the only Anthrax album not featuring the traditional Anthrax logo on its artwork.

Stomp 442 is also Anthrax's first album without Dan Spitz on lead guitar. Though not credited as a member of the band, Paul Crook took over lead guitar duties.

Critical reception

AllMusic reviewer Stephen Thomas Erlewine gave the album a negative review, describing it as "a generic collection of speed metal bombast". He finished his review by saying that the record is a "disheartening experience." Reviewer Jimmy Neeson had a more positive view, noting, "A savage Anthrax album; and a worthy addition to any metal collection." Canadian journalist Martin Popoff described Stomp 442 as "a fine, responsible collection of working man's metal, if a bit of a repetition" compared to "the relatively unappreciated Sound of White Noise" of 1993.

Cover art
The album's cover gained controversy when retailer Walmart refused to stock it in its stores, because of the naked man standing next to the giant ball of garbage.

In a 1996 interview with Tom Russell of Glasgow-based radio Clyde 1, Bruce Dickinson revealed that the original design for the cover art was done for his album Balls to Picasso – originally to be titled Laughing in the Hiding Bush – but he couldn't afford it. His album's title was changed and he drew two squares on a toilet wall for the cover.

Track listing

Personnel 
All credits adapted from the original release.
Anthrax
John Bush – lead vocals
Scott Ian – rhythm guitar, backing vocals
Frank Bello – bass, backing vocals
Charlie Benante – drums, percussion, guitars

Guests
Paul Crook – lead guitars on "Random Acts of Senseless Violence", "Perpetual Motion", "In a Zone" and "Drop the Ball"
Dimebag Darrell – guitar on "King Size" and "Riding Shotgun"
Mike Tempesta – guitar on "American Pompeii"
Zach Throne - guitar solo on "Celebrated Summer"

Production
Butcher Bros. and Anthrax – producers, mixing
Butcher Bros., Dirk Grobelny, Ian Cross – engineers
Mike Monterulo, J.J. Bottari, Chris Gately, Phil Nowlan – assistant engineers
Manny Lecuona – editing
Bob Ludwig – mastering

Charts

References

External links

Anthrax (American band) albums
1995 albums
Albums with cover art by Storm Thorgerson
Elektra Records albums
Warner Music Group albums